Kowloon Union Church is a church in Jordan, Hong Kong. It is a declared monument.

External links

 Antiquities and Monuments Office: Kowloon Union Church

Declared monuments of Hong Kong
Yau Ma Tei
Protestant churches in Hong Kong